Many steam and diesel locomotives have operated on the Watercress Line or Mid-Hants Railway, a heritage railway in Hampshire, England.

Steam locomotives

Diesel locomotives

Locomotives that visited the Watercress Line  
Many locomotives have visited the Watercress Line over the years.

References

External links 
Mid Hants Railway – "The Watercress Line" official website.

Watercress Line
Locomotives of Great Britain